This article is about the particular significance of the year 2010 to Lithuania and its people.

Incumbents 
President: Dalia Grybauskaitė
Prime Minister: Andrius Kubilius

Chairmanships 
Community of Democracies

Events 
May 28 – was held Sidabrinė gervė 2010.
August 8 – wind flaw killed 4 people.
August 27 – Gritė Maruškevičiūtė won Miss Lithuania 2010 title.
October 7 – Lithuania and European Space Agency written cooperation agreement.

Sports 
July 1–3 – Alytus held 2010 Lithuania Swimming Championships
July 9–10 – in S. Darius and S. Girėnas Stadium was held 2010 Lithuanian Athletics Championships.
July 22-August 1 – Lithuania held and won U18 European Championship Men 2010 Division A.
July 27-August 1 – Živilė Balčiūnaitė won gold medal for Lithuania at marathon event in 2010 European Athletics Championships.
August 14–26 – Lithuania achieved 19th place in 2010 Summer Youth Olympics with 5 medal (3 golden and 2 bronze)
September 9–19 – Nida held 2010 Lithuanian Sailing Championships.
September 12 – Lithuanian national basketball team won bronze medal at 2010 FIBA World Championship.
November 25 – Vytautas Janušaitis won silver medal in 2010 European Short Course Swimming Championships.
 November – Vilnius held Lithuania Open darts championship.
Lithuanian Sportsman of the Year 2010: Simona Krupeckaitė

Deaths 
January 20 - Abraham Sutzkever, Yiddish poet.
January 25 – Algirdas Petrulis, painter.
January 26 - Eugenijus Karpavičius, illustrator.
April 8 - Stanislovas Gediminas Ilgūnas, politician. In 1990 he was among those who signed the Act of the Re-Establishment of the State of Lithuania.
June 26 - Algirdas Brazauskas, the first President of a newly independent post-Soviet Union Lithuania from 1993 to 1998 and Prime Minister from 2001 to 2006.
July 7 - Vytautas Čekanauskas, architect, professor of the Vilnius Academy of Art.

References 

 
Lithuania
Years of the 21st century in Lithuania
2010s in Lithuania
Lithuania